Mantrapping for Sport and Profit is the fourth album from the New Hampshire group Scissorfight.

Track listing
 "Acid for Blood" - 3:22
 "New Hampshire's All Right If You Like Fighting - 3:00
 "Rats U.S.A." - 2:38
 "Deliver The Yankee Coffin" - 2:31
 "The Most Dangerous Animal Is Me" - 3:44 
 "Hazard to Navigation" - 5:55
 "Hammerdown" - 3:01
 "Blizzards, Buzzards, Bastards" - 3:55 
 "Mantrap" - 2:35
 "Death In The Wilderness" - 2:55 
 "Candy Clark" - 2:55
 "Go Cave!" - 3:15
 "Cram It Clown" - 1:41

Personnel
Ironlung – vocals
Geezum H. Crow (Jay Fortin) – guitar
Kevin J. Strongbow – drums
Paul Jarvis – bass guitar

2001 albums
Scissorfight albums